Each winner of the 1978 Governor General's Awards for Literary Merit was selected by a panel of judges administered by the Canada Council for the Arts.

English language
Fiction: Alice Munro, Who Do You Think You Are?
Poetry or Drama: Patrick Lane, Poems New and Selected.
Non-Fiction: Roger Caron, Go-Boy! Memories of a Life Behind Bars.

French language
Fiction: Jacques Poulin, Les grandes marées.
Poetry or Drama: Gilbert Langevin, Mon refuge est un volcan.
Non-Fiction: François-Marc Gagnon, Paul-Emile Borduas : Biographie critique et analyse de l'oeuvre.

Governor General's Awards
Governor General's Awards
1978 literary awards